Blabe crawleyi is a small, extinct prehistoric bony fish probably belonging to the family Serranidae that lived during the middle division of the Eocene epoch of Egypt.

The generic name translates as "nuisance," referring to how the lack of scales on the type specimen frustrated its describer's attempts to understand the fish's exact systemic position.  The specific name commemorates one Cecil Crawley, who discovered the first specimen.

See also

 Prehistoric fish
 List of prehistoric bony fish

References

Eocene fish
Serranidae
Ray-finned fish enigmatic taxa
Paleogene animals of Africa